The Sincheon is a stream flowing through eastern Daegu, South Korea.  It rises from the Naengcheon and other streams in Gachang-myeon, Dalseong-gun, in the rural south of the city, and flows north through the east side of the city center to reach the Geumho River.  For much of its length it is bordered by a riverwalk on either side.  In addition, the west bank is the site of the Sincheon Expressway.  

The name "Sincheon" means "new stream."   This name refers to its being constructed as part of a flood containment project ordered by local official Yi Seo during the reign of King Jeongjo in 1778.  Since that time, the stream has been continuously subject to human interventions, for flood control, recreation, and other purposes.
But there are other theories about the derivation of the name "Sincheon". Chances are that the name was written incorrectly as 'Shincheon ' in the process of the Korean name 'Saecheon' being written in Chinese characters

In the course of its run, the Sincheon passes through every district of Daegu except one:  beginning in Dalseong-gun, it passes between Suseong-gu and Nam-gu and Jung-gu, then flowing through a brief section of Dong-gu and entering Buk-gu, where it reaches its end.

The Sincheon is habitat to a large population of birds, including mallard ducks as well as gray herons and little egrets.  In addition, it is habitat for the Eurasian river otter, Lutra lutra.  The herons, egrets and otters all feed on the abundant population of fish.

See also
Rivers of Korea
Environment of South Korea

Notes

References

Rivers of South Korea
Geography of Daegu